Cardale is an unincorporated community in Fayette County, Pennsylvania, United States. Cardale has a post office, with ZIP code 15420, which opened on September 5, 1924.

References

Unincorporated communities in Fayette County, Pennsylvania
Unincorporated communities in Pennsylvania